Meiconodon is an extinct genus of alticonodontine triconodontid which existed in China during the early Cretaceous period (Aptian/Albian age). It was described by Nao Kusuhashi, Yaoming Hu, Yuanqing Wang, Satoshi Hirasawa and Hiroshige Matsuoka in 2009 and the type species is Meiconodon lii.

References

Cretaceous mammals
Triconodontidae
Fossil taxa described in 2009
Extinct mammals of Asia
Taxa named by Nao Kusuhashi
Taxa named by Yaoming Hu
Taxa named by Yuanqing Wang
Taxa named by Satoshi Hirasawa
Taxa named by Hiroshige Matsuoka
Prehistoric mammal genera